The First Day of Spring is a 1956 West German comedy film directed by Helmut Weiss and starring Luise Ullrich, Paul Dahlke and Ingeborg Schöner. It was based on the 1935 play Call It a Day by the British writer Dodie Smith.

It was made at the Spandau Studios in Berlin. The film's sets were designed by the art directors Mathias Matthies and Ellen Schmidt.

Cast
 Luise Ullrich as Dolly
 Paul Dahlke as Robert Hiller
 Ingeborg Schöner as Vera
 Matthias Fuchs as Martin
 Angelika Meissner as Lilo
 Fita Benkhoff as Käthe
 Robert Freitag as Bruno
 Gustav Fröhlich as Paul Frank
 Heli Finkenzeller as Edith
 Brigitte Grothum as Trixi
 Blandine Ebinger as Elsi
 Carla Hagen as Fanny
 Lori Leux as Oma
 Katharina Mayberg as Bettina Morelli
 Kurt Roy as Albert
 Lou Seitz as Martha
 Horst Willer as Fred

See also
 Call It a Day (1937)

References

Bibliography 
 Parish, James Robert. Film Actors Guide. Scarecrow Press, 1977.

External links 
 

1956 films
West German films
German comedy films
1956 comedy films
1950s German-language films
Films directed by Helmut Weiss
Remakes of American films
German films based on plays
Films based on works by Dodie Smith
Films shot at Spandau Studios
1950s German films
German black-and-white films